The City of Jesolo Trophy is an annual women's gymnastics competition held in Jesolo, Italy. There are competitions for the senior division and junior division. The United States won the senior team competition every year from 2010 to 2017.

Editions 
Here is a list of team and individual winners throughout the Junior and Senior divisions.

2008

2009

2010
In 2010, the two events in the competition were the team all-around and individual all-around. The United States, Great Britain, Italy, and Russia competed in the senior division. The U.S. won the team competition. Russia was second and Italy third.

Aly Raisman of the U.S. won the senior all-around with a score of 57.650. Ksenia Semenova of Russia was second at 56.900. Vanessa Ferrari of Italy was one-tenth of a point lower to finish third.

In the junior all-around, Russia's Anastasia Grishina won the gold medal.

2011
In 2011, the U.S. repeated as team champions, outscoring Italy 232.250 to 212.800. Russia was third at 210.200.

In the individual all-around, the U.S. swept the top four spots. McKayla Maroney (57.850) won the gold medal, Jordyn Wieber (57.700) the silver, and Raisman (57.400) the bronze. Gabby Douglas was fourth. Maroney also won the vault title, while Raisman won on balance beam and tied for first on floor exercise.

The U.S. also won the junior team competition. Kyla Ross of the U.S. won the junior individual title.

Douglas, Maroney, Raisman, Ross, and Wieber later made up the U.S. squad nicknamed the "Fierce Five" that won the team competition gold medal at the 2012 Summer Olympics.

2012
The U.S. won the senior team competition again in 2012. Italy was second and Russia third.

For the second straight year, U.S. gymnasts earned the top four spots in the individual all-around competition. Ross, the junior champion in 2011, won the senior division title with a score of 59.850. Raisman was second at 59.050. Sarah Finnegan was third at 58.650. Maroney was fourth.

Ross won the uneven bars and balance beam competitions. Maroney repeated as the vault champion. Grishina won on floor.

In the junior division, the U.S. won the team title, and Lexie Priessman of the U.S. won the individual all-around.

2013
In the senior division, US once again won the team title. Italy's A team placed second, while Japan won bronze.

The United States' six senior gymnasts placed first through sixth in the all-around competition, with first-year senior Simone Biles winning gold with a score of 60.400, Kyla Ross taking silver with 58.650, and Brenna Dowell placing third with 56.650.

During the apparatus finals, Biles won three of the four available gold medals, placing first on vault, balance beam, and floor. Ross won the uneven bars title as well as the balance beam silver medal.

Junior Bailie Key of the United States won the all-around title, with Enus Mariani of Italy and Amelia Hundley of USA placing second and third, respectively. In the junior team final, Italy's A team won gold, while the country's B team took bronze. Japan's gymnasts won the silver.

2014 
The competition took place on the 22–23 March 2014. Teams from the US, Italy, Australia, Japan and Romania competed. The United States nearly swept the gold medals, missing out only on the senior beam title, which was won by Andreea Munteanu of Romania.

References

 
Gymnastics competitions in Italy
Sport in Veneto